Biswajit Bhattacharya is a retired Indian professional footballer and football manager. He most recently managed Calcutta Football League club Calcutta Customs and is the current head coach of West Bengal football team.

Playing career

East Bengal
Bhattacharya played as a striker in the India national football team and played for both the Calcutta Football League clubs East Bengal and Mohun Bagan. In 1985, he won Federation Cup with East Bengal and went on to play at the 1985–86 Asian Club Championship in Saudi Arabia. Managed by P. K. Banerjee, East Bengal was part of Central Asia Zone, and the tournament was named "Coca-Cola Cup" where they defeated multiple teams to win it. In the opener against New Road Team of Nepal, they earned a massive 7–0 win, where Bhattacharya netted four goals. They also defeated Dhaka Abahani 1–0, thrashed Club Valencia of Maldives 9–0 (the biggest margin of victory by an Indian team over any foreign opponents).

India
He represented India at the 1984 AFC Asian Cup in Singapore. He scored a goal against Poland in 1984 Nehru Cup. That was India's only goal in the tournament. After a bike accident, Bhattacharya left his playing career and entered into coaching.

Managerial career
Bhattacharya managed East Bengal in the 2015–16 season and helped the team winning Calcutta Football League. In 2017–18, he managed Mohammedan Sporting. With Mohammedan, he won Bordoloi Trophy, defeating Oil India Limited by 3–1 margin in final. In 2018, he was appointed head coach of Peerless in the Calcutta Football League.

In 2019, he moved abroad and managed Bhutan Premier League club Paro. In that year, they won league title. On 1 July 2021, Southern Samity appointed Bhattacharya as their new head coach. The club began their 2021–22 Calcutta Premier Division campaign with a 3–0 defeat against Mohammedan Sporting, and Bhattacharya was succeeded by Saeed Ramon in September. He later managed century-old club Calcutta Customs.

In 2022, Bhattacharya took charge of West Bengal and helped the team clinching gold at the 36th National Games of India, defeating Kerala 5–0 in final in Ahmedabad. He later guided the team in 2022–23 Santosh Trophy, but they failed to break into the semi-finals hosted in Saudi Arabia.

Honours

Player
East Bengal
 Federation Cup: 1984–85
 Coca Cola Cup: 1985
Bengal
 Santosh Trophy: 1981-82

Manager
East Bengal
 Calcutta Football League: 2015–16
Mohammedan Sporting
 Bordoloi Trophy: 2018
 Bodoland Martyrs Gold Cup: 2018
 Darjeeling Gold Cup runner-up: 2018

Paro
 Bhutan Premier League: 2019
 Jigme Dorji Wangchuk Memorial Gold Cup: 2019

West Bengal
 National Games Gold medal: 2022

See also

List of East Bengal Club coaches
List of India national football team captains

References

Further reading 
 
 
 
 
 

 Chattopadhyay, Hariprasad (2017). Mohun Bagan–East Bengal . Kolkata: Parul Prakashan.

External links

Living people
Indian footballers
East Bengal Club players
Indian football managers
Indian football coaches
India international footballers
1984 AFC Asian Cup players
Footballers from Kolkata
I-League managers
Mohun Bagan AC managers
East Bengal Club managers
Calcutta Football League players
Footballers at the 1982 Asian Games
Footballers at the 1986 Asian Games
1964 births
Association football forwards
Asian Games competitors for India
Mohammedan SC (Kolkata) managers